Joshua Odongo Onono is a Kenyan running for Deputy President in the March 2013 Kenyan Presidential election on an Alliance of Real Change party ticket. He is the running mate to Mohammed Abduba Dida.

References 

Living people
Alliance for Real Change (Kenya) politicians
Year of birth missing (living people)